Gulde may refer to:

Gulde, Mississippi, an unincorporated community in Rankin County, Mississippi, United States

People with the surname
Manuel Gulde (born 1991), German footballer

See also
Gould (disambiguation)